Shah Bahrami (also Romanized as Shāh Bahrāmī; also known as Shāh Bahrām) is a village in Kavar Rural District, in the Central District of Kavar County, Fars Province, Iran. At the 2006 census, its population was 18, in 5 families.

References 

Populated places in Kavar County